Kakinokidani-ike Dam  is a gravity dam located in Hyogo Prefecture in Japan. The dam is used for flood control and irrigation. The dam impounds about 5  ha of land when full and can store 386 thousand cubic meters of water. The construction of the dam was started on 1994 and completed in 2006.

See also
List of dams in Japan

References

Dams in Hyogo Prefecture